Yosef Weitz (1890–1972) was the director of the Land and Afforestation Department of the Jewish National Fund (JNF). From the 1930s, Weitz played a major role in acquiring land for the Yishuv, the pre-state Jewish community in Palestine.

Biography

Yosef Weitz was born in Boremel, Volhynia in the Russian Empire in 1890. In 1908, he immigrated to Palestine with his sister, Miriam, and found employment as a watchman and an agricultural laborer in Rehovot. In 1911, he was one of the organizers of the Union of Agricultural Laborers in Eretz Yisrael. Weitz married Ruhama and their eldest son, Ra'anan, was born in 1913. Two years later, in 1915, Yosef Weitz was appointed foreman of the Sejera training farm (now Ilaniya) in the Lower Galilee. Weitz helped to found Yavniel, one of the first pioneer colonies in the Galilee, and later, the Beit Hakerem neighborhood in Jerusalem. His son Yehiam (Hebrew for "long live the nation"), born in Yavne'el in October 1918, was killed in a Palmach operation known as the Night of the Bridges on June 16, 1946. Kibbutz Yehi'am was established in his memory. Sharon Weitz, another son, followed in his father's footsteps and later took over as director of the Forestry Department.

Both the Ma'ale Yosef Regional Council and Moshav Talmei Yosef are named in the memory of Yosef Weitz.

Forestry

As head of the JNF Forestry Department, Weitz put his visions of Israel as a forested country into practice. He was spurred on by David Ben-Gurion, who told Weitz he wanted a billion trees planted within a decade. In 1949, he proposed a division of labor between the Israeli government and the JNF. The government would engage in applied research in planting techniques, especially in arid areas, and the development of a timber industry. It would also establish nurseries. The JNF would improve indigenous forests, work in afforestation of hilly regions, stop the encroachment of sand dunes and plant windbreakers. Weitz saw plant nurseries and afforestation as a vital source of employment for the masses of new immigrants arriving in the early days of the state. He was guided by the belief that developing a work ethic was imperative for acculturation.
 
In 1966, Yatir Forest in the Negev was planted at Weitz's urging. He described the project as "rolling back the desert with trees, creating a security zone for the people of Israel." Named for the biblical town of Yatir, it is now Israel's largest planted forest.

Weitz never formally studied forestry, but his autodidactic perspective was reflective of the period. The forestry strategy he crafted emphasized the economic utility of forests and the importance of the Aleppo pine as the hardiest of local species. As a result, Israel’s forests for its first twenty years were largely monocultures, which would soon suffer serious losses due to natural pests. Weitz frequently clashed with the nascent conservation movement in Israel, which objected to the Jewish National Fund's industrial approach to tree planting, including pine tree plantations on Mount Gilboa which threatened an endemic plant, Iris haynei (also known as Iris Gilboa). Today, many of Weitz’s ideas have been replaced with more sustainable approaches to foresting.

Views regarding Palestinian Arabs
Weitz was an advocate of population transfer. As the 1948 Palestine war unfolded, he confided to his diary in April that he had drawn up a list of Arab villages to be cleansed to enable Jewish settlement, and had also drawn up a list of land disputes with Arabs that he thought should be resolved by military means.   According to Efraim Karsh, Weitz spoke of establishing a transfer committee, but Ben-Gurion rejected the idea, and no such committee was ever established. Nevertheless, Nur Masalha and Benny Morris claim an unofficial Transfer Committee was established in May 1948 composed of Weitz, Danin and Sasson.

In his capacity as director of the Jewish National Fund, he actively initiated projects to destroy Arab property, ordering  personnel to create obstacles for Arabs attempting to return to cultivate their fields, to destroy villages, and to render habitable other villages in order to enable Jewish settlement. He had discussed these activities with Ben-Gurion on June 8, and according to his diary, gained the latter's approval.  On June 22, 1941 he wrote in his diary: "The land of Israel is not small at all, if only the Arabs were removed, and its frontiers enlarged a little, to the north up to the Litani, and to the east including the Golan Heights...with the Arabs transferred to northern Syria and Iraq...Today we have no other alternative...We will not live here with Arabs."

With regard to the problem of masses of Palestinians  expelled or fleeing from their villages and endeavouring to return later in 1948, Weitz suggested to Ben-Gurion on September 26 that a policy of relentless harassment (hatrada) by every available means was necessary in order to quash any such return.

Published works
 My Diary and Letters to the Children, vols 1-6, Masada, Ramat Gan, 1965, 1973 (the original diaries are in the Central Zionist Archives in Jerusalem).
  HaYa'ar V'haYiur B'Yisrael (The Forest and Forestry in Israel), Masada, Ramat Gan, 1970 p. 140-141.
 Journal entry from June 26, 1946 published in Tlamim Ahronim, Jerusalem, Keren Kayemet, 1974, p. 24-25.
 From Small to Large - The History of Land Reclamation in Eretz-Israel, Ramat Gan, 1972
 Creating a Land Legacy - Chapters from a Diary, Tel Aviv, 1951
Our Settlement Activities in a Period of Storm and Stress, 1936-1947, Tel Aviv, 1947

References

Bibliography
 Nur Masalha (1992). Expulsion of the Palestinians: The Concept of "Transfer" in Zionist Political Thought, 1882-1948, Institute for Palestine Studies, 
Benny Morris: 1948 and after; Israel and the Palestinians, 1994, chapter 4: Yosef Weitz and the Transfer Committees, 1948-1949.
 Alon Tal, Pollution in a Promised Land, An Environmental History of Israel, University of California Press, Berkeley, 2002.
 Tom Segev, 1949, The First Israelis, New York, The Free Press, 1986, p. 29-30.

External links
 

1890 births
1972 deaths
Ukrainian Jews
Jews from the Russian Empire
Emigrants from the Russian Empire to the Ottoman Empire
Israeli conservationists
Israeli civil servants
Zionists from the Russian Empire
Forestry in Israel
People from Rivne Oblast
People from Volhynian Governorate
Ukrainian Zionists